The 1987–88 Bulgarian Cup was the 48th season of the Bulgarian Cup. CSKA Sofia won the competition, beating Levski Sofia 4–1 in the final at the Vasil Levski National Stadium in Sofia.

First round

Group 1

|-
!colspan=5 style="background-color:#D0F0C0;" |19 August / 2 September 1987

|-
!colspan=5 style="background-color:#D0F0C0;" |30 September / 7 October 1987

|}
Vihren Sandanski was eliminated.

Group 2

|-
!colspan=5 style="background-color:#D0F0C0;" |19 August / 2 September 1987

|-
!colspan=5 style="background-color:#D0F0C0;" |30 September / 7 October 1987

|}
Hebar Pazardzhik was eliminated.

Group 3

|-
!colspan=5 style="background-color:#D0F0C0;" |19 August / 2 September 1987

|-
!colspan=5 style="background-color:#D0F0C0;" |30 September / 7 October 1987

|}
Litex Lovech was eliminated.

Group 4

|-
!colspan=5 style="background-color:#D0F0C0;" |19 August / 2 September 1987

|-
!colspan=5 style="background-color:#D0F0C0;" |30 September / 7 October 1987

|}
Dobrudzha Dobrich was eliminated.

Group 5

|-
!colspan=5 style="background-color:#D0F0C0;" |19 August / 2 September 1987

|-
!colspan=5 style="background-color:#D0F0C0;" |30 September / 7 October 1987

|}
Ludogorets Razgrad was eliminated.

Group 6

|-
!colspan=5 style="background-color:#D0F0C0;" |19 August / 2 September 1987

|-
!colspan=5 style="background-color:#D0F0C0;" |30 September / 7 October 1987

|}
Tundzha Yambol was eliminated.

Group 7

|-
!colspan=5 style="background-color:#D0F0C0;" |19 August / 2 September 1987

|-
!colspan=5 style="background-color:#D0F0C0;" |30 September / 7 October 1987

|}
Neftochimic Burgas was eliminated.

Group 8

|-
!colspan=5 style="background-color:#D0F0C0;" |19 August / 2 September 1987

|-
!colspan=5 style="background-color:#D0F0C0;" |30 September / 7 October 1987

|}
Dimitrovgrad was eliminated.

Second round

|-
!colspan=5 style="background-color:#D0F0C0;" |29 November / 12 December 1987

|}

Third round
In this round include the four teams, who participated in the European tournaments (CSKA, Levski, Botev Plovdiv and Lokomotiv Sofia)

|-
!colspan=4 style="background-color:#D0F0C0;" |23 December 1987

|}

Quarter-finals

|-
!colspan=4 style="background-color:#D0F0C0;" |February 1988

|}

Semi-finals

Third place play-off

Final

Details

References

1987-88
1987–88 domestic association football cups
Cup